Orthotylus siuranus is a species of bug from a family of Miridae that is endemic to Spain.

References

Insects described in 1964
Endemic fauna of Spain
Hemiptera of Europe
siuranus